Neale Fraser defeated Rod Laver in the final, 6–4, 3–6, 9–7, 7–5, to win the gentlemen's singles tennis title at the 1960 Wimbledon Championships. Alex Olmedo was the defending champion, but was ineligible to compete after turning professional.

Seeds

  Neale Fraser (champion)
  Barry MacKay (quarterfinals)
  Rod Laver (final)
  Luis Ayala (quarterfinals)
  Nicola Pietrangeli (semifinals)
  Roy Emerson (quarterfinals)
  Ramanathan Krishnan (semifinals)
  Butch Buchholz (quarterfinals)

Draw

Finals

Top half

Section 1

Section 2

Section 3

Section 4

Bottom half

Section 5

Section 6

Section 7

Section 8

References

External links

Men's Singles
Wimbledon Championship by year – Men's singles